The Order of the Star of Italy is an Italian order of chivalry that was founded in 2011. The order was reformed from the Order of the Star of Italian Solidarity by the 11th President of Italy, Giorgio Napolitano. The emphasis of the reformed award was shifted from post-war reconstruction to the preservation and promotion of national prestige abroad, promoting friendly relations and co-operation with other countries and ties with Italy.

Order of the Star of Italy 
This distinction, which qualifies as a second civilian honor of the State, represents a particular honor on behalf of all those, Italians abroad or foreigners, who have acquired special merit in the promotion of friendly relations and cooperation between Italy and other countries and the promotion of ties with Italy. The reasons for granting leave the original connotation of the same post-war award and become more responsive to current realities, whereas, according to the initial setting, it was granted to those who, Italians abroad or foreigners, have especially contributed to the reconstruction of Italy. In particular, the nomination conferring the honor, are considered to have supported the preservation and promotion of national prestige abroad, which translates in various activities, such as the promotion of the Italian language, volunteering and charitable, philanthropic activities, participation in community life of our communities abroad, the scientific and technological research, the pastoral missions, commercial enterprises, the promotion of food and wine and service to our countrymen.

The order is conferred by the President of the Republic on the proposal of the Minister of Foreign Affairs, after consulting the Council of the Order, which shall be chaired by the Minister himself and is composed of four members, one of which is by law the Head of the Diplomatic Protocol of the Republic. A further innovation is the order of the classes, which increased from three to five: Knight Grand Cross, Grand Officer, Commander, Officer and Knight, plus the special class of the Grand Cross of Honor.

The Order of the Star of Italy drops the Christian symbolism from the Order of the Star of Italian Solidarity, where the center of the stars and other insignia are replaced by a circular shield of gold, edged in blue and gold emblem bearing a depiction of the symbol of the republic at the center with the words "STELLA D'ITALIA" in gold letters around the edge.

The implementing regulation was issued by the Presidential Decree November 15, 2011, n. 221 and is in force since 28 January 2012.

For the year 2012 it was expected for there to be 400 honors awarded, broken down as:
 Knight Grand Cross: 10
 Grand Officer: 60
 Commander: 70
 Officer: 100
 Knight: 160

To these can be added up to 10 grand crosses of honour.

The first awards of the Knight Grand Cross were awarded to Alfio Piva Mesen and Fouad Twal on 2 May 2012.

The present classes of the Order are as follows:

Recipients 
As of May 2021, the Order has been awarded as follows:

Grand Cross of Honour
2 awards.

 Carlo Urbani 
 Barbara de Anna

Knight Grand Cross 
24 awards.

 Fouad Twal
 Alfio Piva
 Michel Roger
 Steffen Seibert-Gundelach
 Horst Lorenz Seehofer
 Furio Radin
 Charlene de Mónaco
 Ana Hrustanovich
 Torcuato Salvador Francisco Nicolás di Tella
 Romaldo Giurgola
 Ankie Broekers-Knol
 Esteban José Bullrich
 Sergio Alejandro Bergman
 José Lino Salvador Barañao
 Alejandro Pablo Avelluto
 Nicola Renzi
 Riccardo Guariglia
 Yongyu Huang
 John Eliot Gardiner
 Francisco Maria de Sousa Ribeiro Telles
 Gianfranco Ravasi
 Teresa Scavelli

Other ranks
Appointments include:

 Carlo Ancelotti
 Gianni De Biasi
 Dr Giovanni Coci
 Ehud Gazit
 Erol Gelenbe
 Ms Wajiha Haris
 Valentina Imbeni
 Douglas Leone
 Edward Leigh
 Dario Martinelli
 Gennaro Contaldo
 Jamie Oliver
 Patrick Cassidy
 İlber Ortaylı
 Ferzan Özpetek
 António Filipe Pimentel
 Nanda Rea
 Andriy Shevchenko
 Fatih Terim
 Lyndon Terracini
 Vincenzo Trani
 John Turturro
 Fu Xiaotian
 Serra Yılmaz
 Mari Yamazaki
 Milja Köpsi
 Paul Borg Olivier

References 

Civil awards and decorations of Italy
2011 establishments in Italy
Awards established in 2011